U.S. Route 83 (US 83) is a part of the U.S. Highway System that travels from the Mexico–United States border in Brownsville, Texas, to the Canada–United States border near Westhope, North Dakota. In the state of North Dakota, US 83 extends from the South Dakota border north to the Canada-United States border.

Route description
It follows I-94 west to Bismarck, where it resumes a generally northward course as a four-lane highway.

Headed toward Minot US 83 traverses mostly agricultural land, passing through some small cities such as Wilton, Washburn and Underwood north to Max. Leaving Underwood, US 83 encounters a large strip-mining coal (lignite) operation which can not only be seen from the roadway in the vicinity of Falkirk, but a small viaduct carries coal over the highway. North of Coleharbor, US 83 briefly merges both roadways and shares land with an adjacent railroad line in order to cross a viaduct that separates Lake Sakakawea from Lake Audubon. North of the lakes, the surroundings return to cropland and grazing land, though a wind farm is located south of Minot.

US 83 passes directly through Minot, where it is known as Broadway, although the Minot Bypass to the west is an alternate route. The highway then diverges from ND 5 to head north to the border with Canada.

Major intersections

References

External links

Transportation in Bottineau County, North Dakota
Transportation in Burleigh County, North Dakota
Transportation in Emmons County, North Dakota
Transportation in McLean County, North Dakota
Transportation in Renville County, North Dakota
Transportation in Ward County, North Dakota
 North Dakota
83